Leila Anneli Kiljunen (born 17 September 1957 in Lappeenranta) is a Finnish politician currently serving in the Parliament of Finland for the Social Democratic Party of Finland at the South-Eastern Finland constituency.

References

1957 births
Living people
People from Lappeenranta
Social Democratic Party of Finland politicians
Members of the Parliament of Finland (2003–07)
Members of the Parliament of Finland (2007–11)
Members of the Parliament of Finland (2011–15)
Members of the Parliament of Finland (2019–23)
21st-century Finnish women politicians
Women members of the Parliament of Finland